Romuald Adamovich Muklevich (25 November 1890 – 9 February 1938) was a Soviet military figure and Commander-in-Chief of the Soviet Naval Forces from August 1926 to July 1931.

Early life 
Muklevich was born in Supraśl in the Grodno Governorate of the Russian Empire (currently in Białystok County, Poland). He was a son of a textile worker of Polish ethnicity. He joined the Bolshevik faction of the Russian Social Democratic Labour Party in 1906 and became chairman of several local committees.

Career 
Muklevich was drafted into Baltic Fleet as a sailor in 1912, and completed a marine engineering course (Kronstadt) in 1915 and was promoted to petty officer. 

In 1917 he participated in the February and October revolutions including the storming of the Winter Palace.

In 1918-22 he was political commissar on the Western Front. From 1922 he was commissar of the military academy of the Red Army and in 1925 he was deputy commander of the Soviet Air Force. He was commander of the Soviet Navy between 1926 and 1931. From 1934 he was commissar for the shipbuilding industry and in 1936 he was made deputy People's Commissar (minister) for the defence industries.

During the Great Purge, he was arrested on 28 May 1937, and accused of "organising a Polish fascist conspiracy in the Red Army", to which he confessed under torture. He was sentenced to death on 8 February 1938 and shot the following day. 

Romuald Muklevich was posthumously rehabilitated in 1957.

Personality 
Alexander Barmine wrote that "Fat and sturdy and round-faced, this Old Bolshevik had all the quiet confidence and also the appearance of a born leader ... He was the kind of man whom Stalin does not willingly let live, even behind bars."

Notes 

1890 births
1938 deaths
People from Białystok County
People from Belostoksky Uyezd
Old Bolsheviks
Soviet people of Polish descent
Soviet Navy officers
Russian military personnel of World War I
People of the Russian Revolution
Soviet military personnel of the Russian Civil War
Great Purge victims from Poland
Polish people executed by the Soviet Union
Executed people from Podlaskie Voivodeship
Soviet rehabilitations